Schitt's Creek (stylized as Schitt$ Creek) is a Canadian television sitcom. The series stars Eugene Levy and Catherine O'Hara as Johnny and Moira Rose, a wealthy couple who are forced, after losing all their money, to rebuild their lives in their only remaining asset: the small town of Schitt's Creek, which they once purchased as a joke, where they are living with their two adult children in two adjacent rooms of a rundown motel.

Total awards and nominations for the cast

ACTRA Award in Toronto

American Cinema Editors (ACE) Eddie Awards

Australian Academy of Cinema Television Arts (AACTA) International Awards

Canadian Alliance of Film & Television Costume Arts & Design (CAFTCAD) Awards

Canadian Cinema Editors

Canadian Comedy Awards

Canadian Screen Awards

Costume Designers Guild Awards

Critics' Choice Television Awards

Directors Guild of Canada Awards

Dorian Awards

Dorian TV Awards

GLAAD Media Awards

Golden Globe Awards

Golden Maple Awards

Gracie Awards

Hollywood Critics Association Midseason Awards

INSPIRE Awards

Make-Up Artists and Hair Stylists Guild Awards

MTV Movie & TV Awards

People's Choice Awards

Primetime Emmy Awards

Producers Guild of America Awards

Satellite Awards

Screen Actors Guild (SAG) Awards

Shorty Awards

Television Critics Association (TCA) Awards

The Queerties

Webby Awards

Writers Guild of Canada Screenwriting Awards

Notes

References

Schitt's Creek